Jim Hume MBA FRSA ARAgS HonAssoc BVA is a former Scottish Liberal Democrat politician. He was a Member of the Scottish Parliament (MSP) of the South of Scotland region from May 2007 to March 2016. He is currently Director of Public Affairs & Communications at Support and Mind Scotland and Convenes the National Rural Mental Health Forum.

Background
Hume was born in Peebles but raised in Selkirkshire. His previous positions include Chairman of "Environment and Land Use" for the National Farmers Union of Scotland and President of Lothians and Borders NFU. He was active during the Foot-and-mouth crisis of 2001. Hume was also chair of the Borders Foundation for Rural Sustainability and was on the board of Scottish Enterprise Borders, a member of the Forestry Commission's South of Scotland Regional Forum, a Trustee of The Borders Forest Trust and a founding Director of the South of Scotland Loan Fund Scheme.

Member of the Scottish Parliament
Hume was elected to the Scottish Parliament to represent the South of Scotland region at the 2007 general election, making him the first Liberal Democrat MSP in the region since the Scottish Parliament was created in 1999. He was also elected councillor of the Galashiels and District region of Scottish Borders Council on the same night. Hume was Scottish Liberal Democrat Spokesman for Housing and Health. He sat on the Scottish Parliament's Rural Affairs, Climate Change and Environment Committee, and was the committee's EU Reporter. He was also the Scottish Liberal Democrat Deputy Whip and a member of the European Committee of Regions.

In December 2014, Hume successfully introduced a Member's Bill in the Scottish Parliament, the Smoking Prohibition (Children in Motor Vehicles) (Scotland) Bill. It was enacted in January 2016 and protects 60,000 children every week from the dangers of second hand smoke in cars. In the twelve months following his Bill, the number of children being exposed to second-hand smoke halved.

In October 2015, Hume called on Health Secretary Shona Robison to review support provided for gender identity clinics after new figures revealed that the average waiting time for a first appointment at two of Scotland's GICs was more than a year.

Career timeline
Edinburgh School of Agriculture, Diploma in Agriculture
1997: University of Edinburgh, Masters in Business Administration (MBA)
1998 –2007: Farmer, partner, John Hume and Son (farming firm, Sundhope Farm, Yarrow, Selkirk)
2004–2006: Director of the National Farmers Union of Scotland (NFUS) President of Lothian & Borders NFUS
2000–2006: Trustee Borders Forest Trust (BFT)
2000–2001: Trustee Borders Foundation for Rural Sustainability (BFRS)
2001–2007: Chairman Borders Foundation for Rural Sustainability
2003–2007: Director Scottish Enterprise Borders (SEB)
2005–2007: Member of Forestry Commission Scotland's South of Scotland Regional Forum.
February 2007– 4 May 2007: Director of the National Farmers Union of Scotland (NFUS): Chairman of NFUS Environment & Land Use.
2007 – 2016: Member of the Scottish Parliament for South of Scotland2007–2011: Scottish Liberal Democrat Shadow Minister for the Environment
2007–2008: Member of The Scottish Parliament's Audit Committee
2008–2011: Member of The Scottish Parliament's European & External Relations Committee
2008–2011: Scottish Liberal Democrat Deputy Spokesperson on Environment, Rural Development and Energy
2009 – March 2011: Head of Scottish Parliamentary Campaigns
2011 – 2012: Scottish Liberal Democrat Spokesperson on Rural Affairs, Environment, Climate Change, Housing and Transport
2011 – 2016:. Member of the Scottish Parliament Rural Affairs, Climate Change & Environment Committee.
2011 – 2016: The Scottish Parliament Rural Affairs, Climate Change & Environment Committee's European Reporter.
2011 – 2016: Member of The European Union's Committee of Regions
2012–2106: Scottish Liberal Democrat Spokesperson on Health and Housing
2012–2106: Scottish Liberal Democrat Deputy Whip
2016 – 2018: Trustee of Tweed Forum
2016 – 2018: Board Member of The Broomhouse Centre
2016–present: Director of Policy and Public Affairs, Support in Mind Scotland 
2017–present: Convener of the National Rural Mental Health Forum www.ruralwellbeing.org
2017–present: Non-Executive Director of Scotland's Rural College (SRUC) www.sruc.ac.uk
2018 – 2019: Vice Convener of the Scottish Parliament's Former Members' Association
2018 Associate of the Royal Agricultural Societies (ARAgS)
2018 Honorary Associate of the British Veterinary Association (HonAssoc BVA)
2019–present: Secretary to the Scottish Parliament's Former Members' Association
2019: Liveryman of The Worshipful Company of Farmers and Freeman of The City of London by presentation of The Company

References

External links
 

Living people
1962 births
People from Peebles
Scottish Liberal Democrat councillors
Liberal Democrat MSPs
Scottish farmers
Alumni of the University of Edinburgh
Members of the Scottish Parliament 2007–2011
Members of the Scottish Parliament 2011–2016